The Word Is Out is the first album by Jermaine Stewart, released in 1984. It includes "The Word Is Out", his first major single and first to enter the chart.

Track listing
 "The Word Is Out" (3:27) (Stewart, Greg Craig)
 "I Like It" (3:15) (Stewart, Julian Lindsay)
 "In Love Again" (3:42) (Stewart, Mikey Craig, G. Craig)
 "Spies" (4:04) (Stewart, Lindsay)
 "Reasons Why" (4:43) (Stewart, G. Craig, Lindsay)
 "Get Over It" (3:34) (Stewart, Barry Sarna)
 "You" (2:56) (Stewart, Lindsay)
 "Month of Mondays" (3:27) (Stewart, Lindsay)
 "Debbie" (3:17) (Stewart, Lindsay)
 "Brilliance" (4:41) (Stewart, Lindsay)

Charts

References

1984 debut albums
Jermaine Stewart albums
Arista Records albums
Virgin Records albums
Albums produced by Peter Collins (record producer)